Glodeni is a commune in Mureș County, Transylvania, Romania that is composed of five villages:
Glodeni
Merișor / Pusztaalmás
Moișa / Mezőmajos
Păcureni / Pókakeresztúr
Păingeni / Póka

History 
It formed part of the Székely Land region of the historical Transylvania province. Until 1918, the village belonged to the Maros-Torda County of the Kingdom of Hungary. After the Treaty of Trianon of 1920, it became part of Romania.

Demographics

The commune has an absolute Hungarian majority. According to the 2002 census, it has a population of 3,822 of which 75.67% or 2,892 are Hungarian.

See also 
 List of Hungarian exonyms (Mureș County)

References

Communes in Mureș County
Localities in Transylvania